Novo Horizonte (Portuguese for "New Horizon") is a municipality in the state of São Paulo, Brazil. The population is 41,414 (2020 est.) in an area of 932 km². Novo Horizonte is the center of a Microregion with 79,222 inhabitants.

History

In 1906, the district of Novo Horizonte was created. The city was officially established on December 21, 1916, and installed in October 28, 1917.

Economy

The Tertiary sector is the economic basis of Novo Horizonte. Commerce, services and public administration corresponds to 69.9% of the city GDP. Industry is 21.5% of the GDP, and the Primary sector corresponds to 8.5%.

The cultivation and processing of sugarcane is relevant.

Sport
Grêmio Novorizontino is the local association football club founded in 2010. It's the spiritual successor to Grêmio Esportivo Novorizontino which folded in 1999.

References

Municipalities in São Paulo (state)